The Molise regional election of 1975 took place on 15 June 1975.

Events
Christian Democracy was by far the largest party, gaining almost than three times the share of vote of the Italian Communist Party, which came distantly second.

After the election he was elected President of the Region: the Christian Democrat Florindo D'Aimmo.

Results

Source: Ministry of the Interior

Elections in Molise
1975 elections in Italy
June 1975 events in Europe